Paidia conjuncta is a moth of the family Erebidae. It was described by Otto Staudinger in 1892. It is found in Armenia, Turkey, Iraq and Afghanistan.

Subspecies
Paidia conjuncta conjuncta
Paidia conjuncta ovita de Freina, 1999
Paidia conjuncta major Daniel, 1963

References

Nudariina
Moths described in 1892